The 129th Delaware General Assembly was a meeting of the legislative branch of the state government, consisting of the Delaware Senate and the Delaware House of Representatives. Elections were held the first Tuesday after November 1 and terms began in Dover on the first Tuesday in January. This date was January 4, 1977, which was two weeks before the beginning of the first administrative year of Republican Governor Pierre S. du Pont, IV from New Castle County and the first year for Republican Lieutenant Governor James D. McGinnis from Kent County.

Currently the distribution of seats for both houses was based on the interpretation of the federal 1970 census. It resulted in a large numbers of membership numbers in the New Castle County area and ruling that the election districts would abandonment of county lines for their boundaries, but would design whatever district boundaries that would accomplish such population equals.

In the 129th Delaware General Assembly session both chambers had a Democratic majority.

Leadership

Members

Senate
About half the State Senators were elected every two years for a four-year term, except the decade district redesign year, when all served two years. They were designed for equal populations from all districts and its accomplishment occasionally included some territory from two counties.

House of Representative
All the State Representatives were elected every two years for a two-year term. They were designed for equal populations from all districts and its accomplishment occasionally included some territory from two counties.

References

Places with more information
Delaware Historical Society; website; 505 North Market Street, Wilmington, Delaware 19801; (302) 655-7161
University of Delaware; Library website; 181 South College Avenue, Newark, Delaware 19717; (302) 831-2965

Delaware legislative sessions
1970s in Delaware